is a 2021 Japanese animated original net animation series releasing on YouTube and Pokémon TV by The Pokémon Company.

Pokémon Evolutions is a series of 8 episodes to be released in celebration of the 25th anniversary of Pokémon and is inspired by all 8 regions of the Pokémon world. The series was first announced on September 2, 2021. Each episode is dedicated to each core series region in reverse order by introduction. The first episode was released on September 9, 2021, with subsequent episodes released on a weekly or bi-weekly basis.

Episode list

Characters and voice cast

References 

2021 anime ONAs
Anime television series based on video games
OLM, Inc.
Pokémon anime
YouTube original programming
YouTube Premium original series